Pavel Alyaksandravich Ignatenko (born 8 July 1995) is a Belarusian figure skater. A senior national champion, he has qualified for the free skate at three European and two World Junior Championships. His best result, 13th, came at the 2013 European Championships in Zagreb, Croatia.

Programs

Competitive highlights 
CS: Challenger Series; JGP: Junior Grand Prix

References

External links 

 

1995 births
Belarusian male single skaters
Living people
People from Mogilev
Competitors at the 2013 Winter Universiade
Sportspeople from Mogilev Region
20th-century Belarusian people
21st-century Belarusian people